Emilio Gurruchaga (2 July 1934 – 5 May 2021) was a Spanish sailor. He competed in the Star event at the 1960 Summer Olympics.

References

External links
 

1934 births
2021 deaths
Spanish male sailors (sport)
Olympic sailors of Spain
Sailors at the 1960 Summer Olympics – Star
Sportspeople from San Sebastián
Sailors (sport) from the Basque Country (autonomous community)